Cheung Ngan Yi (born 27 April 1993) is a Hong Kong badminton player.

Career 
Cheung participated in the 2011 BWF World Junior Championships, the 2015 Malaysia Super Series Premier Qualification and in the 2016 Vietnam Open Grand Prix. In 2012, she represented her country in the Uber Cup. Two years later, she participated in the 2014 Asian Games.

She reached semi-finals at the 2013 Austrian International, the 2014 U.S. Open Grand Prix Gold, the 2014 Swiss International and the 2015 New Zealand Open Grand Prix Gold tournaments, won the 2015 Austrian International tournament, and won the women's team bronze medal at the 2013 East Asian Games.

Achievements

BWF International Challenge/Series (1 title) 
Women's singles

  BWF International Challenge tournament
  BWF International Series tournament
  BWF Future Series tournament

References

External links 
 

1993 births
Living people
Hong Kong female badminton players
Badminton players at the 2014 Asian Games
Badminton players at the 2018 Asian Games
Asian Games competitors for Hong Kong
Badminton players at the 2020 Summer Olympics
Olympic badminton players of Hong Kong